Catharina (Toos) Roodzant (née Glimmerveen) (21 October 1896, Rotterdam – 24 February 1999) was a Dutch female chess master.

She won thrice the female Dutch Chess Championship (1935, 1936 and 1938). Roodzant lost a match for the title to Fenny Heemskerk 0.5 : 4.5 in 1937, and lost two matches to Sonja Graf, 0.5 : 3.5 in 1937 and 1 : 3 in 1939, both in Rotterdam.

She tied for 10-16th in the 6th Women's World Chess Championship at Stockholm 1937, and tied for 7-8th in the 7th WWCC which took place during the 8th Chess Olympiad at Buenos Aires 1939 (Vera Menchik won both events).

References

External links
Catharina Roodzant at 365Chess.com

1896 births
1999 deaths
Dutch female chess players
Dutch centenarians
Sportspeople from Rotterdam
Articles containing video clips
Women centenarians
20th-century chess players
20th-century Dutch women
20th-century Dutch people